Kessel (German: From Middle High German Keʒʒel "kettle", "cauldron") is a metonymic occupational name for a maker of copper cooking vessels. Notable people with the surname include:

Al Kessel (c. 1938–2012), founder of Kessel Food Markets
Amanda Kessel (born 1991), American ice hockey player
Barney Kessel (1923–2004), American jazz guitarist
Benjamin Kessel (born 1987), German footballer
Edward L. Kessel (1904–1997), American biologist
Franziska Kessel (1906–1934), German politician
Georgina Kessel, Mexican economist
Gustav von Kessel (1846–1918), German general
Jerrold Kessel (1944–2011), South African-born Israeli journalist
John Kessel (born 1950), American author
John Van Kessel (born 1969), Canadian ice hockey player
Joseph Kessel (1898–1979), French writer
Lipmann Kessel (1914–1986), South African surgeon
Loris Kessel (1950–2010), Swiss racing driver
Mortimer von Kessel (1893–1981), German general
Phil Kessel (born 1987), American ice hockey player
Richard Kessel (born c. 1950), American businessman

See also
 Van Kessel
 Kessell
 Kessler (name)

German-language surnames
Occupational surnames